During the 1918–19 season Hearts competed in the Scottish First Division, the Victory Cup and the East of Scotland Shield.

Fixtures

Wilson Cup

Rosebery Charity Cup

Victory Cup

Scottish Football League

See also
List of Heart of Midlothian F.C. seasons

References

Statistical Record 18-19

External links
Official Club website

Heart of Midlothian F.C. seasons
Heart of Midlothian